Alexander Livingstone may refer to:

Alexander Livingston, 5th Lord Livingston (d. 1553), Scottish landowner
Alexander Livingstone, 1st Earl of Linlithgow (died 1623), 7th Lord Livingston, created Earl of Linlithgow in 1600
Alexander Livingstone (Scottish politician) (1880–1950), Scottish Liberal Member of Parliament 1923–1929
Alexander Livingstone (Alberta politician)

See also
Alexander Livingston (disambiguation)